Lanchester's laws are mathematical formulae for calculating the relative strengths of military forces. The Lanchester equations are differential equations describing the time dependence of two armies' strengths A and B as a function of time, with the function depending only on A and B.

In 1915 and 1916 during World War I, M. Osipov and Frederick Lanchester independently devised a series of differential equations to demonstrate the power relationships between opposing forces. Among these are what is known as Lanchester's linear law (for ancient combat) and Lanchester's square law (for modern combat with long-range weapons such as firearms).

As of 2017 modified variations of the Lanchester equations continue to form the basis of analysis in many of the US Army’s combat simulations, and in 2016 a RAND Corporation report examined by these laws the probable outcome in the event of a Russian invasion into the Baltic nations of Estonia, Latvia, and Lithuania.

Lanchester's linear law 
For ancient combat, between phalanxes of soldiers with spears, say, one soldier could only ever fight exactly one other soldier at a time. If each soldier kills, and is killed by, exactly one other, then the number of soldiers remaining at the end of the battle is simply the difference between the larger army and the smaller, assuming identical weapons.

The linear law also applies to unaimed fire into an enemy-occupied area. The rate of attrition depends on the density of the available targets in the target area as well as the number of weapons shooting. If two forces, occupying the same land area and using the same weapons, shoot randomly into the same target area, they will both suffer the same rate and number of casualties, until the smaller force is eventually eliminated: the greater probability of any one shot hitting the larger force is balanced by the greater number of shots directed at the smaller force.

Lanchester's square law 
Lanchester's square law is also known as the N-square law.

Description 

With firearms engaging each other directly with aimed shooting from a distance, they can attack multiple targets and can receive fire from multiple directions. The rate of attrition now depends only on the number of weapons shooting. Lanchester determined that the power of such a force is proportional not to the number of units it has, but to the square of the number of units. This is known as Lanchester's square law.

More precisely, the law specifies the casualties a shooting force will inflict over a period of time, relative to those inflicted by the opposing force. In its basic form, the law is only useful to predict outcomes and casualties by attrition. It does not apply to whole armies, where tactical deployment means not all troops will be engaged all the time. It only works where each unit (soldier, ship, etc.) can kill only one equivalent unit at a time.  For this reason, the law does not apply to machine guns, artillery with unguided munitions, or nuclear weapons. The law requires an assumption that casualties accumulate over time: it does not work in situations in which opposing troops kill each other instantly, either by shooting simultaneously or by one side getting off the first shot and inflicting multiple casualties.

Note that Lanchester's square law does not apply to technological force, only numerical force; so it requires an N-squared-fold increase in quality to compensate for an N-fold decrease in quantity.

Example equations 
Suppose that two armies, Red and Blue, are engaging each other in combat. Red is shooting a continuous stream of bullets at Blue. Meanwhile, Blue is shooting a continuous stream of bullets at Red.

Let symbol A represent the number of soldiers in the Red force. Each one has offensive firepower α, which is the number of enemy soldiers it can incapacitate (e.g., kill or injure) per unit time. Likewise, Blue has B soldiers, each with offensive firepower β.

Lanchester's square law calculates the number of soldiers lost on each side using the following pair of equations.  Here, dA/dt represents the rate at which the number of Red soldiers is changing at a particular instant. A negative value indicates the loss of soldiers. Similarly, dB/dt represents the rate of change of the number of Blue soldiers.

The solution to these equations shows that:

 If α=β, i.e. the two sides have equal firepower, the side with more soldiers at the beginning of the battle will win;
 If A=B, i.e. the two sides have equal numbers of soldiers, the side with greater firepower will win;
 If A>B and α>β, then Red will win, while if A<B and α<β, Blue will win;
 If A>B but α<β, or A<B but α>β, the winning side will depend on whether the ratio of β/α is greater or less than the square of the ratio of A/B. Thus, if numbers and firepower are unequal in opposite directions, a superiority in firepower equal to the square of the inferiority in numbers is required for victory; or, to put it another way, the effectiveness of the army rises proportionate to the square of the number of people in it, but only linearly with their fighting ability.  

The first three of these conclusions are obvious. The final one is the origin of the name "square law".

Relation to the salvo combat model 
Lanchester's equations are related to the more recent salvo combat model equations, with two main differences.

First, Lanchester's original equations form a continuous time model, whereas the basic salvo equations form a discrete time model.  In a gun battle, bullets or shells are typically fired in large quantities. Each round has a relatively low chance of hitting its target, and does a relatively small amount of damage. Therefore, Lanchester's equations model gunfire as a stream of firepower that continuously weakens the enemy force over time.

By comparison, cruise missiles typically are fired in relatively small quantities. Each one has a high probability of hitting its target, and carries a relatively powerful warhead. Therefore, it makes more sense to model them as a discrete pulse (or salvo) of firepower in a discrete time model.

Second, Lanchester's equations include only offensive firepower, whereas the salvo equations also include defensive firepower.  Given their small size and large number, it is not practical to intercept bullets and shells in a gun battle.  By comparison, cruise missiles can be intercepted (shot down) by surface-to-air missiles and anti-aircraft guns.  So it is important to include such active defenses in a missile combat model.

Lanchester's law in use 
Lanchester's laws have been used to model historical battles for research purposes.  Examples include Pickett's Charge of Confederate infantry against Union infantry during the 1863 Battle of Gettysburg, and the 1940 Battle of Britain between the British and German air forces.

In modern warfare, to take into account that to some extent both linear and the square apply often, an exponent of 1.5 is used.

Attempts have been made to apply Lanchester's laws to conflicts between animal groups. Examples include tests with chimpanzees and fire ants. The chimpanzee application was relatively successful; the fire ant application did not confirm that the square law applied.

Helmbold Parameters

The Helmbold Parameters provide quick, concise, exact numerical indices, soundly based on historical data, for comparing battles with respect to their bitterness and the degree to which side had the advantage. While their definition is modeled after a solution of the Lanchester Square Law's differential equations, their numerical values are based entirely on the initial and final strengths of the opponents and in no way depend upon the validity of Lanchester's  Square Law as a model of attrition during the course of a battle.

The solution of Lanchester's Square Law used here can be written as:

a(t) = cosh(λt) - μsinh(λt)

d(t) = cosh(λt) - (1/μ)sinh(λt)

ε = λT

where t is the time since the battle began, a(t) and d(t) are the surviving fractions of the attacker's and defender's forces at time t, λ is the Helmbold intensity parameter, μ is the Helmbold defender's advantage parameter, T is the duration of the battle, and ε is the Helmbold bitterness parameter.

If the initial and final strengths of the two sides are known it is possible to solve for the parameters a(T), d(T), μ, and ε. If the battle duration T is also known, then it is possible to solve for λ.

If, as is normally the case, ε is small enough that the hyperbolic functions can, without any significant error, be replaced by their series expansion up to terms in the first power of ε, and if we adopt the following abbreviations for the casualty fractions

FA = 1 - a(T)

FD = 1 - d(T),

then the following approximate relations hold:

ε ≅ sqrt(FA * FD)

μ ≅ FA / FD,

That ε is a kind of "average" (specifically, the geometric mean) of the casualty fractions justifies using it as an index of the bitterness of the battle.

We note here that for statistical work it is better to use the natural logarithms of the Helmbold Parameters. We will call them, in an obvious notation, logmu, logeps, and loglam.

Major Findings

See Helmbold (2021):
 The Helmbold parameters logeps and logmu are statistically independent, i.e., they measure distinct features of a battle.
The probability that the defender wins, P(Dwins), is related to the defender's advantage parameter via the logistic function, P(Dwins) = 1 / (1 + exp(-z)), with z = -0.1794 + 5.8694 * logmu. This logistic function is almost exactly skew-symmetric about logmu = 0, rising from P(Dwins) = 0.1 at logmu = -0.4, through P(DWins) = 0.5 at logmu = 0, to P(Dwins) = 0.9 at logmu = +0.4. Because the probability of victory depends on the Helmbold advantage parameter rather than the force ratio, it is clear that force ratio is an inferior and untrustworthy predictor of victory in battle.
 While the defender's advantage varies widely from one battle to the next, on average it has been practically constant since 1600CE.
 Most of the other battle parameters (specifically the initial force strengths, initial force ratios, casualty numbers, casualty exchange ratios, battle durations, and distances advanced by the attacker) have changed so slowly since 1600CE that only the most acute observers would be likely to notice any change over their nominal 50-year military career.
 Bitterness (logeps), casualty fractions (FA and FD in the above notation), and intensity (loglam) also changed slowly before 1939CE. But since then they have followed a startlingly steeper declining  curve.

Some observers have noticed a similar post-WWII decline in casualties at the level of wars instead of battles. There is currently no explanation for this newly-discovered phenomenon. How long the steeply declining rate will persist is uncertain, but because it is so important for military planning, considerable effort should be devoted to determining its causes and to making more certain forecasts of its future values.

See also 
 Attrition warfare
 Lotka–Volterra equations similar mathematical model for predator-prey dynamics
 Maneuver warfare
 Petrie multiplier similar mathematical model for sexism
 Lewis Fry Richardson
 Salvo combat model

References

Bibliography
 Czarnecki, Joseph. N-Squared Law: An Examination of one of the Mathematical Theories behind the Dreadnought Battleship Naval Weapons of the World
 
Helmbold, Robert L. (1961a). "Lanchester Parameters for Some Battles of the Last Two Hundred Years", CORG Staff Paper CORG-SP-122, 14 Feb 1961
Helmbold, Robert L. (1961b). "Lanchester's Equations, Historical Battles, and War Games", Proceedings of the Eighth Military Operations Research Society Symposium, 18-20 October 1961
 Helmbold, Robert L. (2021). "The Key to Victory: Machine Learning the Lessons of History", 12 May 2021, ISBN 978166855289
 
 Niall J. MacKay Lanchester combat models, Mathematics Today, 2006, Vol 42/5, pages 170–173.

External links 
 "Kicking Butt By the Numbers: Lanchester's Laws", a Designer's Notebook column by Ernest Adams in the Gamasutra webzine

Differential equations
Predation